Söderhamn Municipality (Söderhamns kommun) is a municipality in Gävleborg County, in east central Sweden. The seat is located in Söderhamn.

The present municipality was created in 1971 when the former City of Söderhamn was amalgamated with two rural municipalities and parts of a third.

Localities 
Bergvik
Ljusne
Marmaskogen
Marmaverken
Mohed
Sandarne
Skog
Söderala
Söderhamn (seat)
Vallvik
Vannsätter

International relations

Twin towns — Sister cities
The municipality is twinned with:
 Kunda, Estonia
 Jakobstad, Finland
 Os, Hordaland, Norway
 Szczecinek, Poland

References

External links 

Söderhamn - Official site

 
Municipalities of Gävleborg County